Frabosa Sottana is a  (municipality) in the Province of Cuneo in the Italian region Piedmont, located about  south of Turin and about  southeast of Cuneo. The economy is based on winter tourism, based on the nearby ski resort of Prato Nevoso.
 
Frabosa Sottana borders the following municipalities: Frabosa Soprana, Magliano Alpi, Monastero di Vasco, Roccaforte Mondovì, and Villanova Mondovì.

References